The Portuguese League for Professional Football Primeira Liga Player of the Year (often called the LPFP Primeira Liga Player of the Year, the Primeira Liga Player of the Year or simply the Player of the Year) is an annual award given to the player who is adjudged to have been the best of the year in Primeira Liga. Between 2006 and 2010 the winner was chosen only by a vote amongst the members of Sports National Press Club (CNID). Since 2011, thanks to new sponsorship agreements, all the awards related to football belong to Portuguese League for Professional Football (LPFP) and are chosen by a vote amongst their associated.

The award has been presented officially since the 2005–06 season, when the inaugural winner was Ricardo Quaresma. That trophy was delivered during the celebration of Sports National Press Club (CNID) 40th anniversary. Since the 2011–12 season, the award ceremony takes place at Palácio do Freixo, in Porto, Portugal. All Primeira Liga draws are also performed during the same event. The first non-Portuguese to win the title was Lisandro López after the 2007–08 season. In 2012, Hulk became the first player to win the award twice. Jonas became the second player to win the award twice, in 2015 and 2016.

Winners

List of winners

This award has been presented on 16 occasions as of 2021, with 13 different winners. The table indicates the winners and their information, including country, club and position. Every winner was playing for one of the Big Three

Breakdown of winners
By country

By club

Notes

A.  First non-Portuguese player to win the award.
B.  First player to win the award twice.
C.  First non-Portuguese European player to win the award.

References

External links
 The official website of LPFP 
 The official website of CNID 

trophies and awards
Portuguese football trophies and awards
Association football player non-biographical articles